The 1952 San Jose State Spartans football team represented San Jose State College during the 1952 college football season.

San Jose State played as an Independent in 1952. The team was led by third-year head coach Bob Bronzan, and played home games at Spartan Stadium in San Jose, California. They finished the season with a record of six wins and three losses (6–3). Overall, the team outscored its opponents 251–164 for the season.

Schedule

Team players in the NFL
The following San Jose State players were selected in the 1953 NFL Draft.

Notes

References

San Jose State
San Jose State Spartans football seasons
San Jose State Spartans football